Neelambari may refer to:

"Neelambari" (song), 2021 song by Anurag Kulkarni
Neelambari (1978 film), a 1978 Malayalam film 
Neelambari (2001 film), a 2001 Kannada film
Neelambari (2010 film), a 2010 Malayalam film
Neelambari (raga), a raga in Hindustani classical music
Neelambari, a character in the 1999 Indian Tamil-language film Padayappa